Vasundhara Raje Aur Vikasit Rajasthan is a 2016 reference book written by Indian author and historian Vijay Nahar from Pali, Rajasthan and published by Prabhat Prakashan. The book was first given as a gift to Governor of Rajasthan before its market release.

The book covers the personal and professional life of Vasundhara Raje based on references and press releases. It is first book written on Rajasthan Ex. CM Raje. It consists of details of her family background, education at Mumbai, marriage, central BJP politics, entry into Rajasthan BJP politics, CM career from 2003 to 2008, struggling period 2008 to 2013, Rajasthan Assembly Election 2013, Mission 25 and analysis of birth chart.

The book reveals the truth and analysis behind all the controversies of the CM. It also highlights the relationship of Raje with senior BJP leaders. While Union Minister of State, External Affairs, Raje suggested that PM Atal Bihari Vajpayee take the initiative to build and maintain the strong relationship between India and the United States for the technological development and scientific advancement of India. She also won the faith of Home Minister Lalkrishna Advani by giving strong suggestions time to time for growth of India.

On 12–13 May 1998, an atom bomb was successfully tested at Pokhran as per the vision of Vajpayee. International societies in which the USA was a leader banned the aid to be given to India. Raje very strongly represented the vision of India in front of international agencies. As a result, most countries supported India and released the aid later.<ref>{{cite web|title=BDay Special: वसुंधरा राजे बनी राजस्थान की लाखों महिलाओं के लिए मिसाल|url=https://www.punjabkesari.in/national/news/vasundhara-raje--s-today-63rd-birthday-589809|website=www.punjabkesari.in| accessdate=8 March 2017}}</ref> As an Indian Union Minister of State (Independent Charge), Small Scale Industries and Agro & Rural Industries, Raje successfully gave new dimensions to the official system of India. Raje made a proposal for increasing transparency and accountability. This contributed in the implementations of Right to Information Act.

Writer Vijay Nahar has worked as Prant Pracharak of Rastriya Swayamsevak Sangh and wrote various reference books on Indian history, including the book Swarnim Bharat Ke Swapndrishtha Narendra Modi'' on the life of Prime Minister Narendra Modi.

References

2016 non-fiction books
Indian non-fiction books